The Olympic Stade Paul-Julius-Bénard, or officially the Stade olympique Bénard-Paul-Julius, is a stadium of the island of Réunion, Department of Overseas French and outermost region of the European Union in the southwest of the Indian Ocean. Main stadium of the town of St. Paul, it has a capacity of 8,500 seats at the games of the Saint-Pauloise FC and 12,000 for concerts. The stadium underwent major renovations which lasted 1 year and a half. It will reopen May 26, 2012 during a charity match between the friends of Zinedine Zidane and a selection of the Meeting.

External links
 Cafe.daum.net/stade – Stadium Pictures
Stadium information

Football venues in Réunion
Athletics (track and field) venues in Réunion